African village dogs are dogs found in Africa that are directly descended from an ancestral pool of indigenous dogs. African village dogs became the close companion of people in Africa, beginning in North Africa and spreading south.

Dogs entered Africa from the Middle East
The oldest dog remains to be found in Africa date 5,900 years before present (YBP) and were discovered at the Merimde Beni-Salame Neolithic site in the Nile Delta, Egypt. The next oldest remains date 5,500 YBP and were found at Esh Shareinab on the Nile in Sudan. This suggests that the dog arrived from Asia at the same time as domestic sheep and goats. refer page 620 The dog then spread north to south down Africa beside livestock herders, with remains found in archaeological sites dated 925–1,055 YBP at Ntusi in Uganda, dated 950–1,000 YBP at Kalomo in Zambia, and then at sites south of the Limpopo River and into southern Africa.

Genetic diversity 
In 2009, a genetic study of African village dogs found that these were genetically distinct from the non-native and mixed-breed dogs. The village dogs of Africa were a mosaic of native dogs that arrived early into Africa, and non-native mixed breed dogs. The Basenji clustered with the indigenous dogs, but the Pharaoh Hound and the Rhodesian Ridgeback were predominantly of non-African origin.

Local variations 
There are different types of African village dogs:
 Avuvi: a pariah-type village dog from Ghana
 Baganda Dog: a Lurcher-like large game hunting dog from Uganda, named after the Baganda tribe.
 Bagirmi Dog: a large dog with piebald colour, named after the Baguirmi Department of Chad. 
 Cameroon Dog: a hunting dog from West Africa, of medium size and primitive type, with erect ears, long legs and short coat, often piebald in colour, named after Cameroon.
 East African Dog: a hunting dog from Kenya, large in size.
 Hahoawu: a "clean" medium-sized (11 to 14 kg) watch dog from Togo, with a far sight and a coat of fawn or red colour, well adapted to city life, named after the Haho river.
 Liberian Dog (a.k.a. Liberian Terrier): a terrier-like dog from West Africa, small and reddish-brown, named after Liberia.
 Madagascar Hunting Dog: a hunting dog from Madagascar.
 Manboutou Dog: a local variant of the Nyam Nyam kept by the Mangbetu tribe of the Democratic Republic of the Congo.
 Nyam Nyam (a.k.a. Zande Dog): a small hunting dog from Central Africa with erect ears, a curly tail and a short coat of fawn colour, though to be similar or somehow related to the Basenji, named after the Zande tribe.
 Simaku: a ratter from South Africa, also used for cleaning yards (by scavenging waste), developed by crossing pariah dogs with terriers.
 Sudan Greyhound: an extinct hare-hunting dog from Sudan.
 West African Mouse Dog: an extinct small (36 cm) Doberman Pinscher-like ratter, with a short, smooth and red coat.
 Zulu Dog: a small guard and hunting dog with a square muzzle and a fawn coat, named after the Zulu tribe.
Moreover, it is debatable whether the following breeds also belong or belonged to "African village dogs".
 African Hairless Dog: a probably extinct hairless dog.
 Bisharin Greyhound: a hare-hunting dog from Sudan, with erect ears and a curly tail, named after the Bishari tribe.
 Dinka Greyhound: a Greyhound-like pariah hunting dog from Sudan, of a rougher type than the other Sudanese breeds, with a short, fawn coat, named after the Dinka tribe.
 Egyptian Hairless Dog: an extinct hairless dog, close relative or perhaps even the same breed as the African Hairless Dog, small in size (41 cms), with drooping ears.
 Shilluk Greyhound (a.k.a. Shilluk Dog): an antelope-hunting dog with a robust body and semi-erect (folded) ears, usually of red colour with a black mask, named after the Shilluk tribe.
 Zanzibar Greyhound (a.k.a. Zanzibar Dog): a large (68 cms) hunting dog from Zanzibar, with erect ears, a robust body and a red-white colour, believed to be developed by crossing Salukis with pariah dogs.

See also
 Dogs portal
 Africanis
 Basenji
 Free-ranging dog

References 

Dog landraces
Biodiversity